Stan is a common Romanian surname. Notable persons with that name include:

Alexandra Stan (born 1989), Romanian singer
Alexandru Stan (born 1989), Romanian footballer
Kidnapping of Colleen Stan, the girl in the box
Daniel Stan (born 1978), Romanian footballer
Gabriel Stan (born 1952), Romanian football manager
Ilie Stan (born 1967), Romanian footballer and football manager
Lavinia Stan (born 1966), Romanian political scientist
Marius Stan (actor) (born 1961), Romanian scientist and actor
Marius Stan (footballer) (born 1957), Romanian footballer and football official
Mircea Stan (born 1977), Romanian footballer
Sebastian Stan (born 1982), Romanian-American actor
Ștefan Stan (born 1977), Romanian singer
Valerian Stan (born 1955), Romanian military officer, human rights activist and civil servant

See also 
Stanley
 Stan (disambiguation)
 Stan (given name), a Romanian given name
 Stana (disambiguation)
 Stănești (disambiguation)
 Stănuleasa (disambiguation)
 Stănescu (surname)
 Stănoiu (surname) — search for "Stănoiu"
 Stănilă (surname) — search for "Stănilă"
 Stănuleț (surname) — search for "Stănuleț"
 Stăniloae (surname) — search for "Stăniloae"
 Stănișoară (surname) — search for "Stănișoară"
 Stănileşti, a commune in Vaslui County, Romania
 Stana (disambiguation)
 Stâna (disambiguation)
 Stanca (disambiguation)
 Stânca (disambiguation)

References

Surnames of Old English origin
Romanian-language surnames